Keygavar (also Romanized as Keygāvar, Keykāvar, Kīkāvar, and Kīkāvor) is a village in Manjilabad Rural District, in the Central District of Robat Karim County, Tehran Province, Iran. At the 2006 census, its population was 4,201, in 1,042 families.

References 

Populated places in Robat Karim County